Danmarkshavn (Denmark's Harbour) is a small weather station located in Dove Bay, on the northeastern shore of the Germania Land Peninsula, in Northeast Greenland National Park, Greenland.

History
The location was chosen as a suitable winter harbor by the Denmark expedition in 1906 for their ship Danmark. It became the main base of the expedition, from where sledge journeys and scientific observations were carried out.

Description
The permanent population of the base is six. Danmarkshavn is also known as the northernmost location on the coast of the Greenland Sea that non-icebreaking vessels can pass through. Therefore, it is resupplied by cargo ship in August every other year; thus the population increases somewhat for a brief time every other August. The ice situation varies, and some years it is not possible to reach the station, other years it is ice-free further north. It is operated by TELE-POST Greenland, a telecommunications company. Danmarkshavn has a short airstrip .

The station is jointly funded by countries that have ratified the Agreement on the Joint Financing of Certain Air Navigation Services In Greenland.

Climate
Koppen climate classification (ET)

See also
List of research stations in the Arctic

References

External links 
TELE-POST
Issaaffik

Research stations in Greenland